Matthew Stephen Leinart (born May 11, 1983) is an American former professional football player who was a quarterback in the National Football League (NFL) for seven seasons. He played college football at USC, where he won the Heisman Trophy and led his team to an undefeated season as a junior, culminating with a victory in the 2005 BCS National Championship. Selected 10th overall by the Arizona Cardinals in the 2006 NFL Draft, Leinart primarily served as Kurt Warner's backup for four seasons. He spent his final three seasons in a backup role for the Houston Texans and Oakland Raiders. Leinart was inducted to the College Football Hall of Fame in 2017.

Early years
Leinart was born in Santa Ana, California with strabismus (commonly known as "crossed eyes"); his left eye was not aligned correctly with his right. He underwent surgery when he was three years old and was fitted with special glasses to correct the problem, but the eyewear combined with Leinart's already-overweight frame made him an easy target for other children's ridicule. "I used to get made fun of for being cross-eyed. It's just a terrible thing because kids are so cruel to the fat kid, to the kid with the glasses. So I turned to sports," he would later say.

Leinart attended Mater Dei High School and was a letterman in football and basketball. As a junior, he led his team to a California Interscholastic Federation (CIF) Division I co-championship and was named the Serra League's Offensive Most Valuable Player. Wearing number 7, he was chosen as the Gatorade California high school football player of the year.

As one of the nation's top college football recruits, Leinart committed to USC under coach Paul Hackett, noting that a major factor was offensive coordinator Hue Jackson. However, after Hackett and most of his staff were fired in 2000, Leinart considered other programs such as Georgia Tech and Arizona State, and visited Oklahoma and Michigan before USC eventually hired Pete Carroll.

College career
Leinart attended the University of Southern California, where he played for coach Pete Carroll's USC Trojans football team from 2001 to 2005. He redshirted in 2001. As a freshman the next year, he understudied senior quarterback Carson Palmer, who went on to win the Heisman Trophy and was drafted first overall by the Cincinnati Bengals in the 2003 NFL Draft. Leinart appeared in only a few plays in 2002 but did not throw any passes. As a sophomore in 2003, Leinart competed with redshirt junior Matt Cassel, who was Palmer's backup the previous season, and Purdue transfer Brandon Hance for the vacant starting quarterback position. Going into the season, Carroll and his coaching staff selected Leinart, not because he had set himself significantly ahead of the pack in practice, but because they had to pick one of the three as the starting quarterback.

When the coaching staff told Leinart he would be the starter, he replied, "You're never going to regret this." There was some thought in the press that Leinart would merely hold the starting position until highly touted true freshman John David Booty, who had bypassed his senior year in high school to attend USC, could learn the offense.

Leinart's first career pass was a touchdown against Auburn in a 23–0 victory in the season opener. He would win the first three games of his career before the then-#3 Trojans suffered a 34–31 triple-overtime defeat to California on September 27 that dropped the Trojans to #10. Leinart and the Trojans bounced back the next week against Arizona State. Leinart injured his knee in the second quarter and was not expected to play again that day, but he returned to the game and finished 12-of-23 for 289 yards in a 37–17 victory.

Leinart and the Trojans won their final eight games and finished the regular season 11–1 and ranked No. 1 in the AP and coaches' polls. However, USC was left out of the BCS championship game after finishing third in the BCS behind Oklahoma and LSU. The Trojans went to the Rose Bowl and played the University of Michigan. Leinart was named the Rose Bowl MVP after he went 23-of-34 for 327 yards, throwing three touchdowns and catching a touchdown of his own from wide receiver Mike Williams. In 13 starts, Leinart was 255 for 402 for 3,556 yards and 38 touchdowns with nine interceptions. He finished sixth in the Heisman voting.

In recognition of his Rose Bowl accomplishments, Leinart was inducted into the Rose Bowl Hall of Fame in 2019.

Junior and senior seasons
The Trojans started Leinart's junior season (2004) with victories in their first three games. On September 25, the Trojans played Stanford. After Stanford took a 28–17 halftime lead, Leinart sparked the offense with a 51-yard pass to Steve Smith and scored on a one-yard sneak to cut the Cardinal lead to four points. Leinart and the Trojans were able to take the lead on a LenDale White rushing touchdown and held on for the victory, 31–28. Leinart completed 24 of 30 passes.

Leinart finished the final regular season game against UCLA, but was held without a touchdown pass for the first time in 25 starts. Nonetheless, Leinart was invited to New York for the Heisman ceremony, along with teammate Reggie Bush, Oklahoma's freshman running back sensation Adrian Peterson, quarterback and incumbent Heisman winner Jason White, and Utah's quarterback Alex Smith. In what many had considered one of the more competitive Heisman races, Leinart became the sixth USC player to claim the Heisman Trophy.

In 2004, USC went wire-to-wire at No. 1 in the polls and earned a bid to the BCS title game at the Orange Bowl against Oklahoma, which was also 12–0. A dream matchup on paper (including White vs. Leinart, which was to be the first time two Heisman winners would play against each other), the Orange Bowl turned out to be a rout, as Leinart threw for five touchdown passes on 18-for-35 passing and 332 yards to lead the Trojans to a 55–19 victory. Leinart received Orange Bowl MVP honors and the Trojans claimed their first BCS National Championship and second straight No. 1 finish in the AP, extending their winning streak to 22 games. This victory and BCS championship were later vacated as a result of the Reggie Bush scandal (though the AP national championship still stands).

The 2005 Trojans again had a perfect 12–0 regular season. Against Notre Dame, Leinart threw for a career-high 400 yards. After an incomplete pass and a sack led to a fourth-and-nine situation with 1:36 left—at the Trojans' own 26-yard line, Leinart called an audible "slant and go" route at the line of scrimmage and threw deep against the Irish's man-to-man coverage, where Dwayne Jarrett caught the ball and raced to the Irish' 13-yard line, a 61-yard gain. Leinart moved the ball to the goal line as time dwindled and scored on a quarterback sneak that gave the Trojans a 34–31 lead with three seconds to go, giving the Trojans their 28th straight victory and one of the most memorable and dramatic finishes in the history of the Notre Dame–USC rivalry. Leinart was again invited to New York for the Heisman ceremony along with teammate Reggie Bush and Texas quarterback Vince Young. As a former Heisman winner, Leinart cast his first-place vote for Bush, and ended up third in the voting behind Bush (since vacated) and runner-up Young.

The Trojans advanced to the Rose Bowl to face Vince Young and #2 Texas in the BCS title game. The title game was considered another "dream matchup." Leinart himself had a great game, going 29-of-40 for a touchdown and 365 yards, but was overshadowed by Young, who piled up 467 yards of total offense and rushed for three touchdowns, including a score with 19 seconds remaining and two-point conversion to put the Longhorns ahead, 41–38. The Trojans lost for the first time in 35 games, and Leinart for just the second time in his 39 career starts. After graduation, Leinart's #11 jersey was retired at USC.

Leinart finished his college career with 807 completions on 1,245 attempts (64.8% completion percentage) for 10,693 yards and 99 touchdowns with just 23 interceptions. He is USC's all-time leader in career touchdown passes and completion percentage, and is second at USC behind Carson Palmer in completions and yardage. He averaged nearly 8.6 yards per attempt, and averaged only one interception every 54 attempts. He was 37–2 as a starter.

Statistics

Honors

2004

2005
 Orange Bowl MVP
 Unitas Award
 Finalist for Heisman Trophy
 All-American Offensive Player
 LA Sports Sportsman of the Year
 Sporting News Sportsman of the Year

Professional career

2006 NFL Draft
Projected to be the first overall pick of the 2005 NFL Draft, Leinart's draft stock decreased after he chose to return to USC for his senior season. Nonetheless, he remained one of the top prospects in the 2006 NFL Draft. He was selected 10th overall in the draft by the Arizona Cardinals. Leinart was the draft's second-highest selected quarterback after Vince Young, who defeated Leinart's team in the Rose Bowl.

Arizona Cardinals

Leinart spent four seasons with the Cardinals, primarily as a backup for veteran Kurt Warner.

In his first season, after a contentious negotiation making him the last member of the draft to sign a contract, Leinart agreed to a six-year, $51 million contract on August 14. Leinart played in the second quarter of the exhibition game against the New England Patriots on August 19.

Cardinals head coach Dennis Green held a press conference after a poor performance by Warner in Week 3 and announced Leinart would start. He made his debut in the fourth game of the season, throwing two touchdown passes.

In Week 6 against the 5–0 Chicago Bears, Leinart threw two touchdown passes in the first half, but the Bears came back in the second half to win 24–23.

In a November 26 game against the Minnesota Vikings, he set an NFL rookie record with 405 passing yards; however, the team lost to the Minnesota Vikings. His quarterback rating was 74.0. He suffered a sprained left shoulder (throwing arm) in the Week 16 win over the San Francisco 49ers. In 11 starts, Leinart threw for 2,547 yards and 11 touchdowns. He finished the season with a 4–7 record.

Leinart opened the 2007 season on Monday Night Football against the San Francisco 49ers as the starting quarterback. After a sequence of drives, the offense stalled, head coach Ken Whisenhunt began to insert Warner as a situational quarterback. On October 7, 2007, Leinart suffered a fractured left collarbone after being sacked by St. Louis Rams linebacker Will Witherspoon. Three days later, he was placed on injured reserve, ending his season. In his first two NFL seasons, Leinart had suffered two season-ending injuries, all due to being sacked. With Warner at the helm for the remainder of the season, the Cardinals mounted a late-season surge and won five of their final eight games.

In Leinart's second season with Arizona, he started five games, completed 53.6% of his passes (60/112), and threw for 647 yards, 5.8 yards per attempt, two touchdowns, and four interceptions. His passer rating was 61.9. He averaged 129 yards and 0.4 touchdowns per start. In the 2008 offseason, after he recovered from the injury, Leinart was handed his starting job back. Still, his hold on the job was tenuous after another strong training camp performance by Warner. Finally, after Leinart threw three interceptions within a matter of minutes versus the Oakland Raiders in the third preseason game, Warner was named the opening-day starter. Leinart picked up only a limited number of snaps in mop-up duty behind Warner. Warner started 16 games and took the Cardinals to their first ever Super Bowl, cementing his status as starter and Leinart's status as a backup. For the 2008 season, he completed 15 of 29 passing attempts (51.7%), one touchdown, one interception, and an 80.2 passer rating. In 2009, Leinart continued his role as back-up for Warner, who started all but one regular season game.

In 2010, Leinart was named the presumptive starter after Warner's retirement. However, due to poor play, the starting job in training camp was given to Derek Anderson. The Cardinals released Leinart on September 4, two days after the final preseason game, in favor of Anderson and rookies Max Hall and John Skelton.

Houston Texans
On September 6, 2010, the NFL announced that Leinart signed a one-year contract to back up Matt Schaub with the Houston Texans. Since Schaub played all 16 games, Leinart did not play during the 2010 season. During the 2011 offseason, despite speculation that he would sign with the Seattle Seahawks, who were coached by Leinart's college coach Pete Carroll, and compete for a starting job, Leinart ultimately agreed to return to Houston as a backup for the 2011 season. In Week 10, Schaub injured his right foot and the Texans named Leinart their starter. Leinart started for the first time in Week 12 against the Jacksonville Jaguars; however, during the first half he fractured his collarbone and was replaced by rookie quarterback T. J. Yates. At this point in his career, Leinart already suffered three season-ending injuries (2006, 2007, 2011) within his last eight starts.

On March 12, 2012, Leinart was released by the Texans.

Oakland Raiders
Leinart signed with the Oakland Raiders on May 1, 2012, as the backup to his former college teammate and fellow Heisman winner Carson Palmer. After Palmer suffered an injury in Week 16, Leinart and Terrelle Pryor split first-team reps. Pryor ended up getting the start in Week 17 and Leinart was not re-signed by the Raiders the following offseason.

Buffalo Bills
After injuries to quarterbacks EJ Manuel (knee surgery) and Kevin Kolb (concussion), the Bills decided to sign Leinart on August 25, 2013. Leinart and Thad Lewis (who was brought in on the same day through a trade) would compete for the fourth-string quarterback job behind undrafted rookie Jeff Tuel. Lewis won the competition, and Leinart was released by the team on August 30, 2013.

NFL career statistics

Personal life
Leinart has a son with Brynn Cameron, a former USC women's basketball player. The couple split before their son's birth.

As of May 2018, Leinart is married to Make It or Break It and The Mentalist actress Josie Loren. In January 2020, Loren gave birth to Leinart's second son. In May 2021, Loren had his third son.

 Leinart is an analyst on Big Noon Kickoff for Fox Sports 1.

See also

 List of Division I FBS passing yardage leaders

References

External links

 Matt Leinart Foundation
 Arizona Cardinals profile
 Oakland Raiders profile
 
 
 

1983 births
Living people
All-American college football players
American football quarterbacks
Arizona Cardinals players
Buffalo Bills players
College football announcers
College Football Hall of Fame inductees
Fox Sports 1 people
Heisman Trophy winners
Houston Texans players
Oakland Raiders players
Players of American football from California
Sportspeople from Santa Ana, California
USC Trojans football players